Holbrook is a civil parish in the Amber Valley district of Derbyshire, England.  The parish contains 14 listed buildings that are recorded in the National Heritage List for England.  Of these, one is listed at Grade II*, the middle of the three grades, and the others are at Grade II, the lowest grade.  The parish contains the village of Holbrook, the hamlet of Coxbench, and the surrounding area.  Most of the listed buildings are houses, cottages and associated structures, farmhouses and farm buildings.  The other listed buildings include a church and associated structures, and two former stocking frame knitter's workshops.


Key

Buildings

References

Citations

Sources

 

Lists of listed buildings in Derbyshire